Knut Tarald Taraldsen (born 23 March 1948, in Oslo) is a Norwegian linguist working in Tromsø, Norway as a senior researcher at the  Center for Advanced Study in Theoretical Linguistics (CASTL).

His work mostly concerns syntactic theory. He did early, ground-breaking work on parasitic gaps (roughly at the same time as Elisabeth Engdahl), and is also responsible for Taraldsen's generalization concerning the cross-linguistic correlation between null subjects and subject-verb agreement.

References

Linguists from Norway
Syntacticians
1948 births
Living people